BBG Bangaru Talli Charitable Trust (BTCT) is a non profit organisation in India. BTCT is founded by Mallikarjun Reddy M.V.

BBG Bangaru Talli Charitable Trust (BTCT) has successfully completed the empowerment of over 5000 girl children through various educational initiatives in and around various schools of Shadnagar Mandal, Ranga Reddy district.

BBG Bangaru Talli Charitable Trust Now Adopts 40 Government Schools and is Ready to Adopt 60 more by Mid-year

The BBG Bangaru Talli Charitable Trust (BTCT) has adopted 20 primary schools, six upper primary schools and four ZPH schools in Farooq Nagar Mandal.

Campaigns 
BBG Bangaru Talli Charitable Trust has organized the second visit of life skills and career guidance sessions in its adopted schools namely, ZPHS Madhurapur, ZPHS Papireddyguda, ZPHS Burgula, ZPHS Raikal, ZPHS Vityal, and ZPHS Mothighanpur.

External links 

Official Website

Official Video

References 

Charitable trusts